Women's giant slalom events at the 2006 Winter Paralympics were contested at Sestriere on 16 and 17 March.

There were 3 events. Each was contested by skiers from a range of disability classes, and the standings were decided by applying a disability factor to the actual times achieved. All times shown below are calculated times, except for the final "Real time" column.

Visually impaired

The visually impaired event took place on 17 March. It was won by Silvia Parente, representing .

Sitting

The sitting event took place on 17 March. It was won by Kuniko Obinata, representing .

Standing

The standing event took place on 16 March. It was won by Lauren Woolstencroft, representing .

References

W
Para